Pennsylvania House of Representatives District 162 includes part of Delaware County. It is currently represented by Democrat David Delloso.

District profile
The district includes the following areas:

Delaware County:

 Darby Township (PART)
 Ward 01
 Ward 02
 Folcroft
 Glenolden
 Norwood
 Prospect Park
 Ridley Park
 Ridley Township (PART)
 Ward 01 [PART, Division 02]
 Ward 03
 Ward 04
 Ward 05 [PART, Division 02]
 Ward 06
 Ward 08
 Ward 09
 Rutledge
 Sharon Hill

Representatives

Recent election results

References

External links
District map from the United States Census Bureau
Pennsylvania House Legislative District Maps from the Pennsylvania Redistricting Commission.  
Population Data for District 44 from the Pennsylvania Redistricting Commission.

Government of Delaware County, Pennsylvania
162